The 1996 Abierto Mexicano de Tenis, also known by its sponsored name Abierto Mexicano Telcel, was a men's tennis tournament played on outdoor clay courts in Mexico City, Mexico and was part of the World Series of the 1996 ATP Tour. It was the fourth edition of the tournament and took place from 4 March through 10 March 1996. First-seeded Thomas Muster won his fourth consecutive singles title at the event and he regained the world No. 1 ranking from Pete Sampras.

Finals

Singles

 Thomas Muster defeated  Jiří Novák 7–6(7–3), 6–2
 It was Muster's 1st singles title of the year and the 36th of his career.

Doubles

 Donald Johnson /  Francisco Montana defeated  Nicolás Pereira /  Emilio Sánchez 6–2, 6–4
 It was Johnson's 1st title of the year and the 1st of his career. It was Montana's 1st title of the year and the 4th of his career.

References

External links
 Official website 
 ATP tournament profile
 ITF tournament edition details

Abierto Mexicano de Tenis
Mexican Open (tennis)
1996 in Mexican tennis